The Little Mékinac North River flows from North to South, in three municipalities (Sainte-Thècle, Grandes-Piles and Saint-Tite), in the region of Middle Mauricie, in administrative region of Mauricie, in Quebec, in Canada.

Geography 

With a total length of 28 km, the Little Mekinac North River has two major segments: 
 In his head, located in the Lejeune Township to Sainte-Thècle, the river flows in a small mountain valley to the north boundary of Lake Roberge (Grandes-Piles); 
 The mouth of Lake Roberge (Grandes-Piles) icts to mouth in the Rivière des Envies to Saint-Tite.

Northern section of the river
 
19 km along the northern segment of the river has its source in "3rd Lake Champlain" in Sainte-Thècle, whose waters flow southward subsequently in the second lake, then the first Lake Champlain. The course of the river continues south, crossing lakes Cobb-Dorval (2.4 km from the mouth of the next lake), Pelard (2.8 km from the mouth of the small lake Dorval), "à Pierre" and the small lake Dorval [located 3 km from Lake Roberge (Grandes-Piles)]. At the south of Lake Cobb-Dorval, the river receive another discharge from the west which pours the waters of lakes Embryo "du canard" and Button. In front of Nicolas lake, the river receives on the east side, the outlet of Lake Fontaine (Grandes-Piles). Finally, the river flows into a small lake at the north-west of Lake Roberge (Grandes-Piles.) This small lake also receives the waters of the second Lake Roberge which the discharge flows to the southeast.

South-East segment of the river

Very elongated and narrow form, Lake Roberge (Grandes-Piles) is 3.4 km long. It is located between two mountain ranges in the territory of Grandes-Piles. From the mouth of Lake Roberge (Grandes-Piles) (located at the south end of the lake), the "Little Mekinac North River" flows South-East on 6.1 km (relatively in straight line, except for a few curves) at the limit of Saint-Tite. This segment of its river is mostly in mountainous and forested land. From the boundary between Grandes-Piles and Saint-Tite, the river becomes very winding across farmland in "North Mekinac River Row" and "North Rivière des Envies Row". The distance between the mouth of Lake Roberge (Grandes-Piles) and:
 the mouth of the "little Mekinac north river" is 5.5 km (by road);
 the intersection of routes 153 and 159 (at Saint-Tite), is 8.4 km (by road).

Before emptying into the Rivière des Envies in Saint-Tite, "Little Mékinac North River" receives the waters of the "river Mekinac South" (popularly designated "little river south Mekinac").

Toponymy

The toponym "Little Mékinac North River" was registered on December 5, 1968 in the "Bank of place names" of Commission de toponymie du Québec.

See also
 Mékinac Regional County Municipality
 Grandes-Piles
 Saint-Tite
 Sainte-Thècle
 South Mékinac River
 Rivière des Envies
 Batiscanie, Quebec
 Batiscan river
 Lake Roberge (Grandes-Piles)
 Lake Fontaine (Mékinac)
 Lejeune Township

References

External links 
 Municipality of Sainte-Thècle:  
 Mékinac Regional County Municipality: 
 Municipalité régionale de Grandes-Piles: 

Rivers of Mauricie
Mékinac Regional County Municipality